Takayo Lemont Siddle (born May 25, 1986) is an American basketball coach who is the current head coach of the UNC Wilmington Seahawks men's basketball team.

Playing career
Siddle was a basketball standout at John Motley Morehead High School in Eden, North Carolina, averaging 27.0 points, 6.0 assists and 2.0 steals per game as a senior. He attended Hargrave Military Academy in 2004–05 and helped the team reach the prep school championship game. Siddle played college basketball at Gardner–Webb under Rick Scruggs. As a sophomore, Siddle averaged 8.6 points per game. In his junior season, Siddle scored eight points in a 84–68 Runnin' Bulldogs win at Rupp Arena vs. 20th-ranked Kentucky to advance to the final four of the 2007 2K Sports College Hoops Classic in Madison Square Garden.

Coaching career
After his playing career, Siddle became an assistant coach at Hargrave Military Academy for one season under Kevin Keatts. He then returned to his alma mater to work for as an assistant coach at Gardner–Webb for four seasons under both Chris Holtmann and Tim Craft.

Siddle then reunited with Keatts as an assistant coach at UNC Wilmington, where the Seahawks won back-to-back CAA regular season and conference tournament titles in 2016 and 2017. He was named interim coach of the Seahawks in March 2017.

He followed Keatts as an assistant at NC State from 2017 to 2020 before returning to UNC Wilmington as head coach on March 13, 2020, as the 13th head coach in Seahawk history. Siddle signed a five-year deal with a base salary of $300,000 plus supplemental compensation.

Head coaching record

References

1986 births
Living people
American men's basketball coaches
Basketball coaches from North Carolina
Basketball players from North Carolina
Gardner–Webb Runnin' Bulldogs men's basketball coaches
Gardner–Webb Runnin' Bulldogs men's basketball players
NC State Wolfpack men's basketball coaches
People from Eden, North Carolina
UNC Wilmington Seahawks men's basketball coaches